Hutchinson Municipal Airport may refer to:

 Hutchinson Municipal Airport (Kansas) in Hutchinson, Kansas, United States (FAA/IATA: HUT)
 Hutchinson Municipal Airport (Minnesota) in Hutchinson, Minnesota, United States (FAA: HCD)